Bairnsdale railway station is the terminus of the Gippsland line in Victoria, Australia. It serves the city of Bairnsdale, and it opened on 8 May 1888.

Until 1987, the line continued to Orbost. This has been redeveloped as the East Gippsland Rail Trail, a shared bicycle, walking, and horse-riding track.

History

The railway line opened to Bairnsdale in 1888, and from 1916, continued through to Orbost, until this section was closed in 1987. The passenger service to the town was named The Gippslander in 1954, but services were suspended beyond Sale in August 1993.

Following the cessation of log trains in December 1995, the line between Sale and Bairnsdale was closed, until it was partially reopened for log trains in mid-1999. Following major infrastructure repairs, the passenger service was restored on 3 May 2004, as part of the Linking Victoria program. Until mid-2009, a five-day-a-week freight train hauling logs from Bairnsdale to North Geelong Yard operated from a siding approximately 2.5km west of the station.

Until their demolition, Hillside, Lindenow, Fernbank and Munro stations were located between Bairnsdale and Stratford stations.

Location

Platforms and services

Bairnsdale has one platform. It is serviced by V/Line Bairnsdale line services.

Platform 1:
 services to and from Southern Cross

Transport links

V/Line operates road coach services via Bairnsdale station to:
Paynesville
Marlo
Batemans Bay
Canberra

Gallery

References

External links

Victorian Railway Stations Gallery
Melway map

Bairnsdale
Railway stations in Australia opened in 1888
Regional railway stations in Victoria (Australia)
Transport in Gippsland (region)
Shire of East Gippsland